Haidar Abdul-Razzaq Hassan (9 June 1982 – 5 June 2022) was an Iraqi footballer who played as a defender. He represented the Iraq national team internationally.

Career
Haidar Abdul-Razzaq was a talented versatile player capable of playing anywhere in defence. He began his playing career with the Talaba youth team in 1995, he had been playing as a goalkeeper for Al-Shurta youth team before switching to defence. In 1996, he was one of five players brought into the Talaba first team by coach Nazar Ashraf, two years later he was called into the Iraqi Under-17s by Adnan Hamad. He also played under the same coach while with the Iraqi Under-19s. winning the AFC Youth Championship final over Japan in dramatic style. Haidar was called up by Milan Zivadinovic for Iraq's 2002 World Cup qualifiers, making his international debut on 31 January 2000 against Lebanon in Beirut, in a 0–0 draw. He made three other appearances in the 2002 World Cup qualifiers against Bahrain, Saudi Arabia and Iran while Iraq was coached by Croatian Rudolf Belin. He signed for Al-Ansar in Lebanon in 2002 but returned after the end of the war to rejoin Talaba and cemented himself a place on the right-side of defence in the Olympic team.

Death
Haidar died on 5 June 2022 after being assaulted several days before by unknown persons in Baghdad.

Honours
Al-Talaba
Iraqi Premier League: 2001–02
Iraq FA Cup: 2001–02

Iraq
 WAFF Championship: 2002
 Summer Olympic Games: fourth place 2004
 West Asian Games: 2005
 AFC Asian Cup: 2007

References

External links

1982 births
2022 deaths
Sportspeople from Baghdad
Iraqi footballers
Association football defenders
Iraq international footballers
Olympic footballers of Iraq
AFC Asian Cup-winning players
Footballers at the 2004 Summer Olympics
2004 AFC Asian Cup players
2007 AFC Asian Cup players
Syrian Premier League players
Lebanese Premier League players
Al-Talaba SC players
Al-Ittihad Aleppo players
Al Ansar FC players
Iraqi expatriate footballers
Iraqi expatriate sportspeople in Lebanon
Expatriate footballers in Lebanon
Iraqi expatriate sportspeople in Syria
Expatriate footballers in Syria